Theodore John Leonsis (born January 8, 1957) is an American businessman, investor, filmmaker, author, philanthropist, and former politician. He is a former senior executive with America Online (AOL), and the founder, chairman, and CEO of Monumental Sports & Entertainment. He is also founding member and investor in the Revolution Growth Fund, which includes investments in FedBid, Resonate Insights, Optoro and CustomInk. He founded and chaired of SnagFilms, which produced the documentary film Nanking. The film was honored with the 2009 News & Documentary Emmy Award. He is also an author, having published the book The Business of Happiness in 2010.

Personal background 
Leonsis was born on January 8, 1957, in the Brooklyn borough of New York City. Born to a family of working-class Greek immigrant grandparents, who were mill workers, and parents, who worked as a waiter and a secretary. When his high school guidance counselor evaluated his skill set, the counselor concluded that young Ted was destined to work in a grocery store. Leonsis also reflects on his working-class roots that being a grocery store manager was all his dad aspired him to be. During his youth, Leonsis mowed lawns for extra money. One day when mowing, he stumbled upon mowing the lawn owned by a wealthy stockbroker and Georgetown alumnus named Jim Shannon. Impressed by Leonsis, he helped Leonsis gain admission into Georgetown University.

He attended Brooklyn Technical High School, before moving to Lowell, Massachusetts, where he graduated from Lowell High School in 1973. He was first in his family to go to university, where he attended Georgetown University to pursue his undergraduate studies majoring in American Studies, and graduated in 1977 at the top of his class. Also during college, Leonsis, with encouragement from a mentor, Reverend Joseph Durkin, used computers and primitive punch cards as part of working on his thesis which introduced him to the potential fortunes that were to be made in the emerging software and personal computer industries of the early 1980s. After graduating from college, he then moved back to his parents' home in Lowell and began working for Wang Laboratories as a corporate communications manager  and Harris Corp. as a marketing executive.

Business career

LIST Magazine
Leonsis left Harris Corporation in March 1981 when, at the age 25, he moved to Florida and began his first business venture. His first venture was publishing LIST, a technology magazine that focused on the then-new personal computing industry. He raised $1 million in seed capital with his partner Vincent Pica,. The first issue of the magazine was published in 1982, and was a huge success; $50,000 worth of copies were sold near cash registers, bookstores, and newsstands. Two years later, he sold the company to Thomson Reuters for $40 million netting him $20 million.

AOL 
In 1987, Leonsis established the marketing communications company, Redgate Communications Corporation. When the organization was acquired by America Online (AOL) in 1994, Leonsis began working with AOL as a senior executive, remaining with the company for 13 years. Under his leadership, AOL increased its membership from under 800,000 members to over 8 million, while their annual revenue increased from $100 million to $1.5 billion. He held numerous positions at AOL during his years there, completing his tenure and retiring in 2006 as the audience group's president and vice-chairman. , he serves as vice chairman emeritus of AOL.

Monumental Sports & Entertainment 
Leonsis is the founder, majority owner, chairman and CEO of Monumental Sports & Entertainment, which owns the NHL's Washington Capitals, NBA's Washington Wizards, NBA G League's Capital City Go-Go, WNBA's Washington Mystics, and formerly the AFL's Washington Valor and Baltimore Brigade. Monumental Sports additionally owns the Capital One Arena in Washington, D.C. and manages the MedStar Capitals Iceplex and George Mason University's EagleBank Arena. Formed in 2010 by a merger between Leonsis' Lincoln Holdings with Washington Sports & Entertainment, Monumental Sports & Entertainment is the only privately held company in a top-10 market to own and operate five professional sports teams and a major arena.

Media
In January 2013, Monumental Sports & Entertainment launched Monumental Network, a digital platform that serves as a hub for Washington's sports and entertainment news. In 2016 a rebranded Monumental Sports Network was launched for digital, mobile and over-the-top platforms. The new Monumental Sports Network offers an OTT service that provides live streaming of Mystics, Valor and AFL Baltimore games as well as additional live events and games. Monumental and CSN Mid-Atlantic formed an advanced media partnership that not only extended CSN's exclusive media rights to the Capitals and Wizards but also saw Monumental become an equity partner in CSN. Additionally, NBC Sports Group invested in Monumental Sports Network, becoming an equity partner.

Management
After purchasing the Wizards, Leonsis criticized the NBA's salary cap at a luncheon with business leaders. He was fined $100,000 by the league, for "unauthorized public comments regarding the league's collective bargaining negotiations." Leonsis has sought to roll-back changes to the Wizards and Capitals franchises that coincided with the opening of the Verizon Center in 1997. In 2007, he changed the Capitals team logo and its colors back to their original red, white, and blue, and in May 2011, received positive responses from media, fans, players and alumni when the Wizards unveiled a similar red, white and blue color scheme, along with uniforms reminiscent of those worn by the team under their former name, the Bullets, when they won the NBA Championship in 1978. Additionally, he had taken under consideration restoring the Bullets name to the franchise, though critics said that this would "send the wrong message" about gun violence in Washington.

Washington Capitals
Leonsis has owned the Washington Capitals since the spring of 1999, and in that timeframe the team has won ten Southeast Division titles, three Presidents' Trophies, recorded more than 200 consecutive sellouts at Verizon Center (now Capital One Arena), and won a Stanley Cup Championship.

In the early years of his ownership, the Capitals went on to win back-to-back Southeast Division titles in 2000 and 2001, but lost in the first round of the playoffs to the Pittsburgh Penguins. In summer 2001, the Capitals traded for Jaromír Jágr and signed him to what was at the time, the largest contract in NHL history. The trade was enthusiastically well received by fans and over 300 people showed up at Dulles International Airport to greet Jágr when he arrived. After Jágr was traded in 2004, Leonsis was criticized by fans. He was involved in a physical altercation with a fan, who led a mocking chant of Leonsis during the game and hoisted a sign chiding him. In the altercation, Leonsis grabbed and threw the fan to the ground, which also caused a young child to fall to the ground. For his involvement in the scuffle, Leonsis was fined $100,000. He also received a suspension of one week, during which he was prohibited from having any contact with the team.  After the incident, Leonsis personally called the fan to apologize for his actions and invited him and his family to watch a game in the owner's box.

In 2009, a season ticket holder informed Leonsis of a homeless man, Scott Lovell, who spent his nights sleeping outside Verizon Center. Leonsis found Lovell a part-time job as a restaurant kitchen worker and provided him with a paid and furnished apartment, a prosthetic leg and Capitals season tickets for life. In return, Lovell vowed to remain clean and sober.

In 2010, journalist Damien Cox, author of the Ovechkin Project, a biography of Alexander Ovechkin, wrote that Leonsis was trying to circumvent the NHL's salary cap when signing Ovechkin's contract. He also alleged that Leonsis was bribing bloggers for positive coverage of the Capitals. Leonsis said that Cox was angry that he did not receive the access to Ovechkin that he wanted and defended his support for the league.

During the 2009–2010 season, the Capitals earned the NHL's President's Trophy as the team that finished with the most points in the league during the regular season.

The 2010–2011 season marked the highest attendance in franchise history, drawing 754,309 fans. The Capitals, like other teams, have raised ticket prices in recent years. In 2011, after raising ticket prices for the fourth consecutive year while shrinking the size of beers sold at the Verizon Center, he earned the nickname "Leon$i$". In 2001, Leonsis claimed to have written a computer program that prevented Pittsburgh Penguins fans (the Capitals first-round opponent) from purchasing tickets online. When asked if the actions were unfair, Leonsis stated, "I don't care. I'm going to keep doing it." Again in 2009, he received criticism for preventing visiting team fans from purchasing Capitals playoff tickets.

In the face of community opposition, Leonsis has persisted with a plan to expand the billboards around the Verizon Center. Critics said the signage would make the arena more garish and cheapen DC's Chinatown, Leonsis said it was necessary to raise an additional $20 to 30 million in annual revenue, and a sports expert explained that "an owner saddled with underperforming teams is under greater pressure to find income sources." Leonsis persevered and in March 2013 construction of the new signs were announced.

In 2013, Leonsis received a letter about Jack Dibler, a lifelong Capitals fan who had recently been diagnosed with esophageal cancer. In response, Leonsis sent Dibler a package that included a signed Alexander Ovechkin jersey and a letter inviting Dibler and his family to a game.

On June 7, 2018, the Washington Capitals won the Stanley Cup Championship by defeating the Vegas Golden Knights 4 games to 1.  This was the first Stanley Cup victory in the history of the Washington Capitals.

Washington Wizards

Leonsis became the majority owner of the Washington Wizards in June 2010, inheriting a team that had 26 wins and 56 losses during the previous season. Leonsis was initially believed to have taken a fan-centric approach to running the franchise, thought to be listening and responding to the concerns of Wizards supporters through his email and personal website. 

On May 10, 2011, the Wizards unveiled a new color scheme, uniforms and logo. The team reverted to its traditional red, white and blue colors. The uniforms are based very closely on those worn by the Washington Bullets from 1974 to 1987, during the team's glory years. During Leonsis' tenure as owner, the Wizards have compiled a promising young nucleus of players, including John Wall (No. 1 pick in the 2010 NBA Draft), Bradley Beal (No. 3 pick in the 2012 NBA Draft) and Otto Porter Jr. (No. 3 pick in the 2013 NBA Draft). They also acquired veterans like Nenê, Paul Pierce and Marcin Gortat early in Leonsis' tenure. Leonsis was chairman of the NBA's 2014 media committee that negotiated a nine-year expanded partnership with Turner Broadcasting and The Walt Disney Company.

In February 2016, construction started on a new practice facility for the Wizards. The development was paid for by DC taxpayers and District-funded Events DC while Leonsis' contribution to the $55 million cost was considered ceremonial. The Wizards also announced that they would raise ticket prices for a third consecutive year.

Washington Mystics
Leonsis purchased the rights to the Mystics around the same time he took over the Wizards.

Washington Valor and Baltimore Brigade
On March 10, 2016, Leonsis announced that he was purchasing an expansion franchise in the Arena Football League (AFL) to play at the Verizon Center beginning in 2017.  On March 16, 2016, the announcement was made official by AFL commissioner Scott Butera. On July 14, 2016, the team name was revealed as the Washington Valor. On November 14, 2016, Monumental announced that it had acquired an AFL team that would begin play in 2017 in Baltimore. The team name was later revealed as the Baltimore Brigade. But in 2019, those teams went defunct, as the league went bankrupt and dissolved.

Capital City Go-Go
In 2018, Leonsis announced the purchase of an NBA G League franchise that would be later named the Capital City Go-Go.

SnagFilms 
Leonsis is the founder, chairman and largest shareholder of SnagFilms, a content and technology company with a full-service video streaming platform, professional video and journalism content assets and established relationships with the creative community. The company grew out of Leonsis' experience as a film producer. In addition to being the Internet's leading site for watching and sharing nonfiction films, the company owns indieWIRE, a news information and networking site targeted towards independent-minded filmmakers, the film industry and moviegoers alike.

His first production was the documentary Nanking, which premiered at the 2007 Sundance Film Festival. The film is based on the book The Rape of Nanking by Iris Chang. It was honored with the 2008 Peabody Award and the 2009 News & Documentary Emmy Award for Best Historical Programming (Long Form).

In 2008, Leonsis produced Kicking It, which is a documentary by Susan Koch about the 2006 Homeless World Cup. The film was narrated by actor Colin Farrell and featured residents of Afghanistan; Kenya; Dublin, Ireland; Charlotte, North Carolina; Madrid; and Saint Petersburg. The film premiered in January 2008 at the Sundance Film Festival.

A third documentary, A Fighting Chance, tells the story of Kyle Maynard, who became a nationally ranked wrestler, motivational speaker, and bestselling author, despite being born without arms or legs.

In 2013, Leonsis produced the documentary Lost for Life, which explores juvenile offenders who have been sentenced to life without parole.

Revolution Money and Clearspring Technologies
Leonsis is the founder of Revolution Money, a company which provides secure payments through an Internet-based platform. In 2009, the company was sold to American Express; Leonsis is now on the board of directors at American Express. He is currently the chairman of Clearspring Technologies, an online content sharing network, which connects publishers, services and advertisers to audiences on the internet.

Private equity and venture capital 
Leonsis is cofounder and partner in the D.C.-based venture fund, Revolution Growth. Revolution Growth has made investments in: CLEAR, Sportradar, Bigcommerce, CustomInk, Echo360, Optoro, Resonate, sweetgreen, Revolution Foods and Handybook. In a 25-year period he has personally made investments and owned equity stake in numerous companies, including Groupon, Google, AOL, Revolution Money, AddThis, Preview Travel (Travelocity), GridPoint, Inside.com (formerly Mahalo), MobilePosse, ObjectVideo, SB Nation, Zedge, Triporati, Personal, I-Village, Proxicom, ePals, SnagFilms, MediaBank, Two Harbors, Videology, Algentis, Social Radar and Forbes travel guide.

Board game design
Leonsis is also the co-inventor of Only In New York, a board game that blends street savvy and smarts needed to make it in New York City. Players move around the city answering trivia questions about the city and receive the letters N.E.W Y.O.R.K by answering at least one question correctly.

Involvement in eSports 
Leonsis is a member of the investment group, aXiomatic, which owns Team Liquid, a competitive eSports Team, and has made public statements on Forbes regarding his involvement in the industry.

Writing career
Leonsis has authored a number of books, including Blue Magic: The People, Power and Politics Behind the IBM PC and The Business of Happiness: 6 Secrets to Extraordinary Success in Work and Life.

Personal life
Leonsis is married to Lynn Leonsis and they have a son and a daughter. He has been married to Lynn since August 1987. He is an avid fan of sports and music, especially Fugazi, Jimi Hendrix, The Rolling Stones and Elvis Presley. He recalls his experience with music when Leonsis was let out of school and when his parents got home from work where music helped him fill the void during his spare time.

In early 2011, Leonsis purchased a 13-acre estate in Potomac, Maryland. He acquired the property for $20 million after selling homes in McLean, Virginia and Vero Beach, Florida. The  estate was once the home of Joseph P. Kennedy, summer home of Franklin Roosevelt, and was owned by the Gore family from 1942 to 1995. Leonsis purchased the home from Chris Rogers, a telecommunications executive who acquired Leonsis' home in McLean.

Forbes estimates his net worth at around US$1 billion in 2018.

Politics
Leonsis once served as the mayor of Orchid, Florida. Leonsis got involved in politics after he ran a friend's campaign for Congress and worked as an intern for Paul Tsongas's office in Washington, D.C.  He has donated to the campaign of Barack Obama during his 2008 and 2012 elections and Hillary Clinton in 2016.

Philanthropy 
As vice chairman of Washington 2024, Leonsis took on a leading role in the region's bid for Summer 2024 Olympic and Paralympic Games. In June 2014 the United States Olympic Committee identified Washington and three other cities as potential locations. The USOC ultimately selected Los Angeles, which lost the 2024 bid was awarded the 2028 Summer Games.

Leonsis is the founder of the Leonsis Foundation, which supports children "overcome obstacles and achieve their goals".  Through the Leonsis Foundation, his sports teams and the Monumental Sports & Entertainment Foundation, SnagFilms and his family's personal giving, more than 400 charities were served and supported during the last 12 months. These charities and causes include Best Buddies, DC Central Kitchen, See Forever Foundation, Venture Philanthropy Partners, Street Soccer USA, YouthAIDS, GlobalGiving.org, DC-CAP, D.C. College Success Foundation, Potomac School, Georgetown University, Children's Hospital, Potomac Valley Amateur Hockey Association, Salvation Army Angel Tree, Alliance for Lupus Research, Serve DC, Fort Dupont Ice Arena and Ice Hockey Club, USO of Metropolitan Washington, Capital Area Food Bank, Flashes of Hope, Inova Health System Foundation, UNICEF, obesity prevention and numerous local schools, cancer research and awareness programs.

Board membership 
 SnagFilms – founding chairman 
 Groupon – chairman of the board of directors
 Georgetown University – member of the board of directors (2008–2009)
Uptake (business) – member of the board of directors

Honors and awards 
 2001: Businessperson of the Year – Washington Business Journal and 
 2001: Washingtonian of the Year – Washingtonian Magazine 
 2009: Washington's Tech Titans – Washingtonian Magazine 
 2010: Washington Business Hall of Fame – Junior Achievement of Greater Washington
 2010: John Carroll Award – Georgetown University
 2013: Virginia's 50 most influential people – Virginia Business magazine
 2013: No. 1 Sports PowerPlayer in Maryland
 2016 Greater Washington Urban League Unsung Philanthropist Award
 2018 Stanley Cup Champion

Published works
 Leonsis, Ted (1984). Software Master for the IBM PC (128k), Warner Software, 323 pages. 
 Leonsis, Ted (1984). Software Master for Pes: Apple Version (48k), Warner Software. 
 Chposky, James; and Ted Leonsis (1988). Blue Magic: The People, Power and Politics Behind the IBM Personal Computer, Facts on File Publications, 228 pages. 
 Leonsis, Ted (2010). The Business of Happiness: 6 Secrets to Extraordinary Success in Work and Life, Regnery Publishing, 256 pages.

References

External links

 
 
 C-SPAN Q&A interview with Leonsis, May 9, 2010

1957 births
American advertising executives
American billionaires
American business writers
American chairpersons of corporations
American chief executives in the media industry
American chief executives of financial services companies
American telecommunications industry businesspeople
American consulting businesspeople
American documentary film producers
American financial company founders
American Internet company founders
American magazine editors
American magazine publishers (people)
American mass media company founders
American motivational writers
American people of Greek descent
American technology chief executives
American venture capitalists
AOL people
Arena Football League executives
Board game designers
Businesspeople from Massachusetts
Businesspeople from New York City
Businesspeople from Washington, D.C.
Georgetown University alumni
Georgetown University people
Greek Orthodox Christians from the United States
Living people
Mayors of places in Florida
National Hockey League executives
National Hockey League owners
People from Lowell, Massachusetts
Stanley Cup champions
Washington Capitals owners
Washington Mystics owners
Washington Wizards owners
Women's National Basketball Association executives
Writers from Massachusetts
Writers from Brooklyn
Writers from Washington, D.C.
Shorty Award winners